Ammar Ali Ibrahim Abu-Aleeqa (born 13 March 1985) is a retired Jordanian international footballer who plays as a defender.

References

External links
 
 

1985 births
Living people
Jordanian footballers
People from Irbid
Association football defenders
Al-Arabi (Jordan) players
Al-Baqa'a Club players
Al-Ramtha SC players
Al-Ahli SC (Amman) players
Al-Faisaly SC players
Al-Hussein SC (Irbid) players
Al-Sareeh SC players
Jordanian Pro League players
Jordan international footballers
Jordan youth international footballers
Footballers at the 2006 Asian Games
Asian Games competitors for Jordan